"What Them Girls Like" is a hip hop song. It is the first single from Ludacris's sixth studio album Theater of the Mind. The single features Chris Brown and Sean Garrett and is produced by Darkchild.

Critical reception
Allmusic editor David Jeffries called this song completely unsurprising, with rock-solid hook. Ken Copabianco described the song: His "sex talk is good-natured and slyly insightful about love ("What Them Girls Like")" XXL Magazine wrote a mixed review: "Elsewhere, he’s just straight reaching—“What Them Girls Like,” for instance, where, despite taking a cue from 2000’s Mel Gibson chick flick What Women Want, there’s no real solid connection established between the film and the actual song."

Music video
The music video premiered on Yahoo! Music on September 11. The video takes cues from the Mel Gibson movie "What Women Want". The music video premiered on BET and later appeared at #80 on the Notarized: Top 100 Videos of 2008 countdown. Comfort Fedoke, DeRay Davis, Tyrese Gibson, Teairra Mari, Kristia Krueger, Suelyn Medeiros, Amber Rose, Joe & Gavin Maloof and La La made cameo appearances in the video. There is a 40-second intro before the music starts in the video.

Charts

Weekly charts

Year-end charts

Certifications

References

External links
 

2008 singles
Chris Brown songs
Ludacris songs
Music videos directed by Chris Robinson (director)
Song recordings produced by Rodney Jerkins
Songs written by Sean Garrett
Songs written by Ludacris
Songs written by Rodney Jerkins
2008 songs
Def Jam Recordings singles